Hawtrey is a surname. Notable people with the surname include:

 Anthony Hawtrey (1909–1954), English actor and theatre director
 Edward Craven Hawtrey (1789–1862), English educationalist

 George Procter Hawtrey (1847–1910), British actor, playwright and pageantmaster
 Henry Hawtrey (1882–1961), British athlete
 John Hawtrey (1850–1925), English amateur footballer
 Kay Hawtrey (1926–2021), Canadian actress
 Kim Hawtrey, Australian economist
 Ralph George Hawtrey (1879–1975), British economist

See also
 Hawtrey, Ontario for the community in Norwich, Ontario
 Hawtreys, independent boys' preparatory school